Subrata Sarkar (24 July 1929 – 8 February 2000) was an Indian cricketer. He played one first-class match for Bengal in 1953/54.

See also
 List of Bengal cricketers

References

External links
 

1929 births
2000 deaths
Indian cricketers
Bengal cricketers
Cricketers from Kolkata